Six-Gun Law is a 1948 American Western film directed by Ray Nazarro and written by Barry Shipman. The film stars Charles Starrett, Nancy Saunders, Paul Campbell, Hugh Prosser, Curly Clements and Smiley Burnette. The film was released on January 9, 1948, by Columbia Pictures.

Plot

Cast          
Charles Starrett as Steve Norris / The Durango Kid
Nancy Saunders as June Wallace
Paul Campbell as Jim Wallace
Hugh Prosser as Decker 
Curly Clements as Curley
Smiley Burnette as Smiley Burnette
George Chesebro as Bret Wallace
Billy Dix as Crowl
Robert J. Wilke as Larson
John L. Cason as Ben
Ethan Laidlaw as Sheriff Brackett
Pierce Lyden as Marshal Jack Reed
Bud Osborne as Barton
Budd Buster as Duffy

References

External links
 

1948 films
1940s English-language films
American Western (genre) films
1948 Western (genre) films
Columbia Pictures films
Films directed by Ray Nazarro
American black-and-white films
1940s American films